Kevin Jesse Lee Jr. (born September 4, 1992) is an American professional mixed martial artist who competes in the Welterweight division of the Ultimate Fighting Championship (UFC) and formerly competed in the Lightweight and Super Lightweight divisions of the UFC and Eagle Fighting Championship (EFC).

Background
Lee was born in Grand Rapids, Michigan, on September 4, 1992, and raised in Detroit, Michigan. Lee has a sister and two younger brothers, one of whom is Keith, also a professional mixed martial artist signed to Bellator who has been training with Kevin previously at Xtreme Couture and currently at Tristar.

He competed in basketball growing up and began wrestling during his junior year at Southfield High School. Lee continued his wrestling career at Grand Valley State University, where he was a national tournament qualifier and went 37–0 as a sophomore. However, with two years left of wrestling eligibility at the school, Lee dropped out to focus on a career in mixed martial arts.

Mixed martial arts career

Ultimate Fighting Championship

2014
Lee made his promotional debut against Al Iaquinta on February 1, 2014, at UFC 169. He lost the fight via unanimous decision. After the loss, Lee moved from his native Michigan to Las Vegas, searching for improvements to his game.

At The Ultimate Fighter 19 Finale on July 6, 2014, Lee got his first win for the promotion when he defeated Jesse Ronson by split decision.

Lee faced Jon Tuck at UFC 178 on September 27, 2014. Lee won the fight via unanimous decision.

2015
Lee faced Michel Prazeres on February 14, 2015, at UFC Fight Night 60. Lee won the fight by unanimous decision.

Lee next faced James Moontasri on July 15, 2015, at UFC Fight Night 71. Lee won the fight via first round submission.

Lee faced Leonardo Santos on December 12, 2015, at UFC 194. Lee lost the fight via TKO in the first round.

2016
Lee next faced Efrain Escudero on April 23, 2016, at UFC 197. Lee won the fight via unanimous decision.

Lee next faced Jake Matthews on July 8, 2016, at The Ultimate Fighter 23 Finale. Lee won the fight via TKO in the first round.

Lee faced Magomed Mustafaev at UFC Fight Night 99 on November 19, 2016. He won the fight via submission in the second round. The win earned Lee his first Performance of the Night bonus award.

2017
Lee faced Francisco Trinaldo on March 11, 2017, at UFC Fight Night 106. After a back-and-forth first round, Lee won the fight via submission in the second round.

Lee faced Michael Chiesa on June 25, 2017, at UFC Fight Night 112. He won the fight via submission at the end of the first round. The win also earned Lee his second Performance of the Night bonus award. Chiesa appealed to the Oklahoma State Athletic Commission to overturn the defeat, claiming referee Mario Yamasaki erred both in stopping the fight despite no tapout nor loss of consciousness and in allowing Lee to use illegal downward elbows, which cut his head.

Lee fought Tony Ferguson on October 7, 2017, at UFC 216 for the interim UFC Lightweight Championship. Despite starting off strong, Lee lost the fight by submission in the third round.

2018
Lee fought Edson Barboza on April 21, 2018, at UFC Fight Night 128. At the weigh-ins, Lee weighed in at 157 pounds, one pound over the lightweight non-title fight upper limit of 156 pounds. As a result, the bout proceeded at catchweight and Lee was fined 20% of his purse which went to Barboza. Lee was rocked badly by a spinning heel kick, and was nearly finished by Barboza in the third round, but rallied back and defeated Barboza via TKO after the ringside doctor stopped the bout due to a cut suffered by Barboza in round five.

Lee faced Al Iaquinta in a rematch on December 15, 2018, at UFC on Fox 31. He lost the fight via unanimous decision.

2019
Lee moved up to welterweight to face Rafael dos Anjos in the main event of UFC on ESPN+ 10 on May 18, 2019. He lost the fight via an arm triangle submission in the fourth round.

In September 2019, Lee announced he would be returning to the lightweight division.

Lee faced undefeated prospect Gregor Gillespie on November 2, 2019, at UFC 244. Lee won the fight via knockout in the first round. This win earned him the Performance of the Night award.

2020
Lee faced Charles Oliveira on March 14, 2020, as the main event at UFC Fight Night 170. At the weigh-ins, Lee weighed in at 158.5 lbs, 2.5 lbs over the lightweight non-title fight limit of 156 pounds. Lee was fined 20% of his purse and his bout with Oliveira was expected to proceed as scheduled at a catchweight. Lee lost the fight via submission with a guillotine choke in the third round.

2021
Lee was scheduled to face Sean Brady on July 10, 2021, at UFC 264. However, Lee withdrew due to injury and the bout was rescheduled to UFC on ESPN 30 on August 28, 2021. Subsequently, the bout was yet again canceled after Brady withdrew due to a foot infection. Brady was replaced by Daniel Rodriguez on August 28, 2021, at UFC on ESPN 30. On his return to welterweight, Lee lost the fight via unanimous decision. Subsequently, Lee tested positive for Adderall and was suspended for six months, making him eligible to return into competition on February 28, 2022. In an interview, Lee stated that he thought the drug would be out of his system soon enough, which is why he didn't apply for therapeutic-use exemption regarding his medication for recently diagnosed ADHD.

On November 30, 2021, it was announced that Lee was released from the UFC.

Eagle Fighting Championship 
On December 15, 2021, it was announced that Lee signed a 4-fight contract with Eagle FC.

Lee made his debut against Diego Sanchez in a 165 lbs bout on March 11, 2022, at Eagle FC 46. He won the fight via unanimous decision.

Return to UFC 
In early 2023, it was reported Lee has signed a deal with UFC to compete in the promotion.

Personal life

Religion 
On 9 January 2023, Lee announced his conversion to Islam.

Politics 
Lee endorsed Bernie Sanders in the 2020 presidential election, speaking at a rally for Sanders in Las Vegas in December 2019.

Championships and accomplishments
Total Warrior Combat
TWC Lightweight Championship (One time)
Ultimate Fighting Championship
Performance of the Night (Three times)

Mixed martial arts record

|-
| Win
| align=center|19–7
| Diego Sanchez
| Decision (unanimous)
| Eagle FC 46
| 
| align=center|3
| align=center|5:00
| Miami, Florida, United States
| 
|-
|Loss
|align=center|18–7
|Daniel Rodriguez
|Decision (unanimous)
|UFC on ESPN: Barboza vs. Chikadze
|
|align=center|3
|align=center|5:00
|Las Vegas, Nevada, United States
|
|-
|Loss
|align=center|18–6
|Charles Oliveira
|Submission (guillotine choke)
|UFC Fight Night: Lee vs. Oliveira 
|
|align=center|3
|align=center|0:28
|Brasília, Brazil
|
|-
|Win
|align=center|18–5
|Gregor Gillespie
|KO (head kick)
|UFC 244 
|
|align=center|1
|align=center|2:47
|New York City, New York, United States
|
|-
|Loss
|align=center|17–5
|Rafael dos Anjos
|Submission (arm-triangle choke)
|UFC Fight Night: dos Anjos vs. Lee
|
|align=center|4
|align=center|3:47
|Rochester, New York, United States
|
|-
|Loss
|align=center|17–4
|Al Iaquinta
|Decision (unanimous)
|UFC on Fox: Lee vs. Iaquinta 2
|
|align=center|5
|align=center|5:00
|Milwaukee, Wisconsin, United States
|
|- 
|Win
|align=center|17–3
|Edson Barboza
|TKO (doctor stoppage)
|UFC Fight Night: Barboza vs. Lee
|
|align=center|5
|align=center|2:18
|Atlantic City, New Jersey, United States
|
|-
|Loss
|align=center|16–3
|Tony Ferguson
|Submission (triangle choke)
|UFC 216
|
|align=center|3
|align=center|4:02
|Las Vegas, Nevada, United States
|
|-
|Win
|align=center|16–2
|Michael Chiesa
|Technical submission (rear-naked choke)
|UFC Fight Night: Chiesa vs. Lee
|
|align=center|1
|align=center|4:37
|Oklahoma City, Oklahoma, United States
| 
|-
|Win
|align=center|15–2
|Francisco Trinaldo
|Submission (rear-naked choke) 
|UFC Fight Night: Belfort vs. Gastelum
|
|align=center|2
|align=center|3:12
|Fortaleza, Brazil
|
|-
|Win
|align=center|14–2
|Magomed Mustafaev
|Technical submission (rear-naked choke) 
|UFC Fight Night: Mousasi vs. Hall 2
|
|align=center|2
|align=center|4:31
|Belfast, Northern Ireland
|
|-
|Win
|align=center|13–2
|Jake Matthews
|TKO (punches)
|The Ultimate Fighter: Team Joanna vs. Team Cláudia Finale
|
|align=center|1
|align=center|4:06
|Las Vegas, Nevada, United States
|
|-
|Win
|align=center|12–2
|Efrain Escudero
|Decision (unanimous)
|UFC 197
|
|align=center|3
|align=center|5:00
|Las Vegas, Nevada, United States
| 
|-
|Loss
|align=center|11–2
|Leonardo Santos
| TKO (punches)
|UFC 194
|
|align=center|1
|align=center|3:26
|Las Vegas, Nevada, United States
|    
|-
|Win
|align=center|11–1
|James Moontasri
|Submission (rear-naked choke)
|UFC Fight Night: Mir vs. Duffee
|
|align=center|1
|align=center|2:56
|San Diego, California, United States
|
|-
|Win
|align=center|10–1
|Michel Prazeres
|Decision (unanimous)
|UFC Fight Night: Henderson vs. Thatch
|
|align=center|3
|align=center|5:00
|Broomfield, Colorado, United States
|
|-
|Win
|align=center|9–1
|Jon Tuck
|Decision (unanimous)
|UFC 178
|
|align=center|3
|align=center|5:00
|Las Vegas, Nevada, United States
|
|-
|Win
|align=center|8–1
|Jesse Ronson
|Decision (split)
|The Ultimate Fighter: Team Edgar vs. Team Penn Finale
|
|align=center|3
|align=center|5:00
|Las Vegas, Nevada, United States
|
|-
|Loss
|align=center|7–1
|Al Iaquinta
|Decision (unanimous) 
|UFC 169
|
|align=center|3
|align=center|5:00
|Newark, New Jersey, United States
|
|-
|Win
|align=center|7–0
|Eric Moon
|Submission (standing guillotine choke)
|TWC 20: Final Cut
|
|align=center|1
|align=center|1:24
|Lansing, Michigan, United States
|
|-
|Win
|align=center|6–0
|Travis Gervais
|Submission (armbar)
|Canadian Fighting Championship 8
|
|align=center|1
|align=center|0:46
|Winnipeg, Manitoba, Canada 
|
|-
|Win
|align=center|5–0
|Joseph Lile
|Submission (rear-naked choke)
|Midwest Fight Series 5
|
|align=center|3
|align=center|1:29
|Indianapolis, Indiana, United States
|
|-
|Win
|align=center|4–0
|Kyle Prepolec
|Submission (guillotine choke)
|Michiana Fight League
|
|align=center|2
|align=center|2:17
|South Bend, Indiana, United States
|
|-
|Win
|align=center|3–0
|J. P. Reese
|Decision (unanimous)
|IFL 51: No Guts, No Glory
|
|align=center|3
|align=center|5:00
|Auburn Hills, Michigan, United States
|
|-
|Win
|align=center|2–0
|Mansour Barnaoui
|Decision (unanimous)
|Instinct MMA: Instinct Fighting 4
|
|align=center|3
|align=center|5:00
|Montreal, Quebec, Canada
|
|-
|Win
|align=center|1–0
|Levis Labrie
|Decision (unanimous)
|Instinct MMA: Instinct Fighting 3
|
|align=center|3
|align=center|5:00
|Sherbrooke, Quebec, Canada
|

See also
 List of male mixed martial artists

References

External links
 
 

1992 births
Living people
African-American mixed martial artists
American male mixed martial artists
Lightweight mixed martial artists
Mixed martial artists utilizing collegiate wrestling
Mixed martial artists from Michigan
American male sport wrestlers
Amateur wrestlers
People from Kent County, Michigan
Sportspeople from Grand Rapids, Michigan
Ultimate Fighting Championship male fighters
21st-century African-American sportspeople
African-American Muslims
Converts to Islam